Giorgio Piacentini (born 30 April 1997) is an Italian footballer who plays as a defender for Grumellese.

Career statistics

Club

Notes

References

1997 births
Living people
Italian footballers
Italian expatriate footballers
Italy youth international footballers
Association football defenders
Inter Milan players
U.C. AlbinoLeffe players
A.C. Milan players
Como 1907 players
Lusitano F.C. (Portugal) players
A.C. Ponte San Pietro Isola S.S.D. players
Serie C players
Campeonato de Portugal (league) players
Serie D players
Italian expatriate sportspeople in Portugal
Expatriate footballers in Portugal